David Adjei (born March 3, 1977, in Accra) is a Ghanaian footballer currently playing for Austrian club ASK Köflach.

Career
He began his career in Brazil playing for Corinthians, Atlético Mineiro and Valeriodoce. Then he moved to Europe where he first played in Slovenian Slovenian PrvaLiga clubs Beltinci, Triglav Kranj and Mura and Austrian lower league clubs ASK Köflach and ASV Deutsch Tschantschendorf. He also had a six months short spell in Brunei club DPMM FC in 2006, that played that season in the Premier League Malaysia, and next, he had moved to Indian I-League club Mahindra United where he played between 2006 and 2008.

Internationally, he played 12 matches for the Ghana national under-17 football team.

References

External sources
 Profile at Ghanaweb.
 Profile at 100anosgalo. 

Living people
1977 births
Footballers from Accra
Ghanaian footballers
Ghanaian expatriate footballers
Sport Club Corinthians Paulista players
Clube Atlético Mineiro players
Expatriate footballers in Brazil
Ghanaian expatriate sportspeople in India
NK Mura players
Expatriate footballers in Brunei
Expatriate footballers in Slovenia
Expatriate footballers in India
Expatriate footballers in Austria
Expatriate footballers in Malaysia
Association football midfielders
DPMM FC players
Slovenian PrvaLiga players
NK Beltinci players
NK Triglav Kranj players